(born 12 January 1983 in Nagasaki, Japan) is a former Japanese rugby union player. Taira played 32 matches for the Japan national rugby union team from 2007 to 2011.
Taira played four matches for Japan at the 2007 Rugby World Cup and two matches at the 2011 Rugby World Cup.

References

Living people
1983 births
Japanese rugby union players
Tokyo Sungoliath players
Japan international rugby union players
Rugby union centres